Rachael Solomon (Married name Rachael Evans, born Rachael Jones) is a Welsh actress, singer, choreographer and television presenter.

Solomon, originally from St Asaph, is an in-vision continuity announcer for Cyw (previously Planed Plant Bach), S4C's service for young children.

Prior to this, she was a singer with the Welsh pop group Eden alongside Emma Walford & Non Parry and appeared as Jaci Roberts in the HTV drama series for Welsh learners, Talk About Welsh, between 1996 and 2001.

References

Welsh television presenters
Welsh women television presenters
Welsh radio presenters
Welsh women radio presenters
Welsh women singers
British choreographers
Women choreographers
Radio and television announcers
Living people
Year of birth missing (living people)